Cercospora rubrotincta is a fungal plant pathogen. It can cause leaf spot in stone fruits.

See also
 List of peach and nectarine diseases

References

rubrotincta
Fungal tree pathogens and diseases
Stone fruit tree diseases